The 2023 USC Trojans football team will represent the University of Southern California as a member of the Pac-12 Conference during the 2023 NCAA Division I FBS football season. The Trojans are expected to be led by Lincoln Riley in his second year as head coach. They play their home games at the Los Angeles Memorial Coliseum in Los Angeles.

The season marks the team's last season as members of Pac-12 Conference before joining the Big Ten Conference on July 1, 2024.

Previous season

The Trojans finished the 2022 season 11-3, 8-1 record in Pac-12 play to finish in 1st place. They went on to play in there first Pac-12 Championship Game for the first time since 2017, but would lose to 11th ranked Utah. They would then get invited to play in the Cotton Bowl against 16th ranked Tulane but would lose a tightly competitive game by the score of 46-45.

Offseason

Coaching staff departures

Coaching staff additions

Transfers

Transfers out
The Trojans have lost 15 players via transfer.

Transfers in
The Trojans have added 12 players via transfer. According to 247 Sports, USC had the No. 2 ranked transfer class in the country.

Returning starters
Key departures include : 
Travis Dye (RB – 10 games, 10 started). 
Jordan Addison (WR – 11 games, 11 started). 
Kyle Ford (WR – 12 games, 2 started). 
Josh Falo (TE – 12 games, 5 started).  Bobby Haskins (OT – 13 games, 9 started).  Andrew Vorhees (OG – 11 games, 11 started).  Brett Neilon (C – 13 games, 13 started).  Tuli Tuipulotu (DL – 14 games, 14 started).  Nick Figueroa (DL – 14 games, 10 started).  Brandon Pili (DL – 14 games, 1 started).  Mekhi Blackmon (DB – 14 games, 14 started).  Alex Stadthaus (K – 14 games).

Other departures include :  Mo Hasan (QB)  Terrell Bynum (WR – 11 games, 1 started).  Gary Bryant Jr. (WR – 3 games).  CJ Williams (WR – 10 games).  Ethan Rae (TE).  Sean Mahoney (TE).  Joe Bryson (OT – 13 games).
 Jason Rodriguez (OT).  Caadyn Stephen (OT).  Ralen Goforth (LB – 11 games, 3 started).  Tuasivi Nomura (LB – 12 games, 3 started).  Adonis Otey (DB).

Offense

Defense

Special teams

* Bowl game not played. 
^ Waiting decision for 2023 season. 
† Indicates player was a starter in 2021 but missed all of 2022 due to injury.

Recruiting class

USC signed 21 players in the class of 2023. The Trojans' was ranked twelfth by 247Sports rankings. Six USC signees were ranked in the ESPN 300 top prospect list. USC also signed walk-ons during national signing period. 

*= 247Sports Composite rating; ratings are out of 1.00. (five stars= 1.00–.98, four stars= .97–.90, three stars= .80–.89, two stars= .79–.70, no stars= <70)
†= Despite being rated as a four and five star recruit by ESPN, On3.com, Rivals.com and 247Sports.com, Malachi Nelson and Zachariah Branch received a five star 247Sports Composite rating.
Δ= Left the USC program following signing but prior to the 2023 season.

2023 overall class rankings

Walk-ons

Preseason

Spring Game

Award watch lists 
Listed in the order that they were released

Pac-12 Media Day

Preseason All-Pac-12 teams and All-American honors
First Team

Second Team

All-Pac-12 Honorable Mention

Source:

Schedule

Personnel

Roster and coaching staff

Depth chart

True Freshman

Injury report

Scholarship distribution chart

 
Projected Scholarship Distribution 2023 chart

^ : the players who still have to make an official choice and the players who are eligible for the Covid year.

 /  / * Former Walk-on / 

– 86 players on scholarship (+ 1 LDS Mission + 1 Transfer Portal out) / 85 scholarships permitted

Games summaries

vs San Jose State

vs Nevada

vs Stanford

at Arizona State

at Colorado

vs Arizona

at Notre Dame

vs Utah

at California

vs Washington

at Oregon

vs UCLA (Victory Bell)

Rankings

Statistics

Team

Individual Leaders

Offense

Defense

Key: POS: Position, SOLO: Solo Tackles, AST: Assisted Tackles, TOT: Total Tackles, TFL: Tackles-for-loss, SACK: Quarterback Sacks, INT: Interceptions, BU: Passes Broken Up, PD: Passes Defended, QBH: Quarterback Hits, FR: Fumbles Recovered, FF: Forced Fumbles, BLK: Kicks or Punts Blocked, SAF: Safeties, TD : Touchdown

Special teams

Scoring

USC vs. non-conference opponents

USC vs. Pac-12 opponents

USC vs. all opponents

After the season

Awards and honors

Pac-12 Conference Individual Awards

Individual Yearly Awards

All-America

PAC-12 Conference

Bowl games

Senior Bowl

East–West Shrine Bowl

NFLPA Collegiate Bowl

NFL draft

The NFL Draft will be held at Campus Martius Park in Detroit, MI.
 
Trojans who were picked in the 2024 NFL Draft:

NFL Draft combine
No members of the 2023 team were invited to participate in drills at the 2024 NFL scouting Combine.
 

† Top performer
 
DNP = Did not participate

USC Pro Day

† Top performer
 
DNP = Did not participate

References

USC
USC Trojans football seasons
USC Trojans football
USC Trojans football